Concha  (plural conchas, meaning "shell" in Spanish) is a traditional Mexican sweet bread roll (pan dulce). Conchas get their name from their round shape and their striped, seashell-like appearance. A concha consists of two parts, a sweetened bread roll, and a crunchy topping (composed of flour, butter, and sugar). 

Conchas rose in popularity with attention from chefs; some added fillings and some spices. Conchas became so popular that a "concha bun burger" won the James Beard Foundation's Blended Burger Project in 2016.

References 

Mexican breads
Mexican desserts